Eremocosta is a genus of Eremobatid camel spiders, first described by Carl Friedrich Roewer in 1934.

Species 
, the World Solifugae Catalog accepts the following fourteen species:

 Eremocosta acuitlapanensis (Vázquez & Gaviño-Rojas, 2000) — Mexico
 Eremocosta arenarum Ballesteros & Francke, 2007 — Mexico
 Eremocosta bajaensis (Muma, 1986) — Mexico, US (California)
 Eremocosta calexicensis (Muma, 1951) — Mexico, US (Arizona, California)
 Eremocosta formidabilis (Simon, 1879) — Mexico
 Eremocosta fusca (Muma, 1986) — Mexico
 Eremocosta gigas Roewer, 1934 — Mexico
 Eremocosta gigasella (Muma, 1970) — Mexico, US (New Mexico, Texas)
 Eremocosta montezuma (Roewer, 1934) — Mexico
 Eremocosta nigrimana (Pocock, 1895) — unknown
 Eremocosta robusta (Roewer, 1934) — US (California)
 Eremocosta spinipalpis (Kraepelin, 1899) — Mexico
 Eremocosta striata (Putnam, 1883) — Mexico, US (Arizona, California)
 Eremocosta titania (Muma, 1951) — Mexico, US (California, Nevada)

References 

Arachnid genera
Solifugae